Hypselobarbus kurali is a species of ray-finned fish in the genus Hypselobarbus which is endemic to the southern Western Ghats.

Footnotes 

 

Hypselobarbus
Fish described in 1995